The Ministry of Labour and Social Affairs was a ministry of the Albanian Government charged with the responsibility to protect and safeguard the interest of workers in general and the poor, deprived and disadvantaged sections of the society. The Ministry was dissolved on 13 September 2017 and its departments were merged with other ministries. Most of its functions are now performed by the Ministry of Health and Social Protection.

History
It was first established on 13 January 1945 by the first Communist government that emerged from that year's elections under the name of the Ministry of Social Assistance.

Since the establishment of the institution, the Ministry of Labor and Social Affairs has been reorganized by joining other departments or merging with other ministries, thus making its name change several times. This list reflects the changes made since 1992:
 Ministry of Social Assistance (Ministria e Asistencës Sociale)
 Ministry of Labor, Immigration, Social Assistance and former Political Persecuted (Ministria e Punës, Emigracionit, Përkrahjes sociale dhe ish të Përndjekurve Politikë) from 1992 to 1996
 Ministry of Labor and Social Affairs (Ministria e Punës dhe e Çështjeve Sociale) from 1996 to 2002 (dissolved)
 Ministry of Labor and Social Affairs (Ministria e Punës dhe e Çështjeve Sociale) from 2003 (re-established) to 2005
 Ministry of Labor, Social Affairs and Equal Opportunities (Ministria e Punës, Çështjeve Sociale dhe Shanseve të Barabarta) from 2005 to 2013
 Ministry of Social Welfare and Youth (Ministria e Mirëqenies Sociale dhe Rinisë) from 2013 to 2017 (dissolved)

The ministry was dissolved in September 2017. The department of labour and social affairs was merged with the Ministry of Health and Social Protection, while the Youth Department joined the Ministry of Education, Sports and Youth.

Officeholders (1945–2017)
 Bedri Spahiu (13 January 1945 – 21 March 1946)
 Elmaz Sherifi (12 March 1997 – 24 June 1997)
 Kosta Barka (11 September 2005 – 2 October 2008)
 Anastas Duro (2 October 2008 – 14 May 2009)
 Viktor Gumi (14 May 2009 – 17 September 2009)
 Spiro Ksera (17 September 2009 – 15 September 2013)
 Erion Veliaj (15 September 2013 – 11 May 2015)
 Blendi Klosi (26 May 2015 – 19 March 2017)
 Olta Xhaçka (24 March 2017 – 22 May 2017
 Xhulieta Kërtusha (22 May 2017 – 13 September 2017)

References

Labour
Albania
Albania
Labor in Albania
1945 establishments in Albania